The Glorious Burden is the seventh studio album by the American power metal band Iced Earth. It is a concept album, which explores various moments in military history, such as the signing of the Declaration of Independence, the American Revolutionary War, and Waterloo.  It also pays tribute to world events such as World War I, the World Trade Center attacks and the ravages of Attila the Hun. See the track list for links to the historical context of the songs.

The album includes a trilogy entitled Gettysburg (1863).  Each of the three songs represents one day in the Battle of Gettysburg, the largest battle ever conducted in the Western Hemisphere and considered the turning point in the American Civil War.

This album features the debut of lead singer Tim "Ripper" Owens, formerly of Judas Priest. Owens, who at that time was still in Judas Priest, was asked to do the vocals as a side project. However, he joined the band full-time after Judas Priest reunited with Rob Halford. The album was first recorded with Matt Barlow on vocals, but band leader Jon Schaffer was not satisfied with his performance. Due to the events of September 11, Barlow became more interested in law enforcement than the music business, and according to Schaffer "Matt's heart was not in it and it showed in his performance."  As a result, Matt left the band and the album was shelved until a new vocalist could be found. However, some of Barlow's initial recordings remain on the record as backing vocals, and he is credited with co-writing two songs.

This record is the only Iced Earth album to feature Ralph Santolla on lead guitars. This was the last studio album for bassist James MacDonough and drummer Richard Christy.

The album was released in three different formats: a limited edition two-disc version in digipak format, and single-disc American and European versions. See the track list for the differences.

"The Reckoning (Don't Tread on Me)", "Declaration Day", and the acoustic version of "When the Eagle Cries (Unplugged)" were all released as music videos.

Track listing

Limited edition digipak version

Disc 1

Disc 2: Gettysburg (1863)

American version

European version

Personnel

References

2004 albums
Iced Earth albums
SPV/Steamhammer albums
Concept albums
Albums recorded at Morrisound Recording
Albums with cover art by Travis Smith (artist)
Works about the Battle of Waterloo
Works about the American Revolution
Musical compositions about the American Civil War
Works about the Iraq War
World War I in popular culture
World War II in popular culture
Music about the September 11 attacks
Cultural depictions of Manfred von Richthofen
Cultural depictions of Attila the Hun